Fruela I (or Froila I), (c. 722 – 14 January 768) called the Cruel, was the King of Asturias from 757 until his death, when he was assassinated. He was the eldest son of Alfonso I and continued the work of his father.  Pelayo was his maternal grandfather.

He suppressed an uprising of the Basques, from whom he took the noble Munia (or Munina), whom he later married. Or according to their familiar ties a usual marriage alliance was renewed between their families, interpreted in the Asturians court as a diplomatic victory over the independent Basque Duchy; or, a much needed collaboration between the two Houses to reduce a seceding faction of the Alavese Basques risking a defection of these to the Banu Qasi down in the Ebro valley, with the hand of his cousin Munia as prize. Whether the marriage entailed the lands of Alava or other Basques as dowry it is not clear, but the Houses of Asturias and Pamplona would wrestle for control of this area of their shifting border realms for centuries, being culturally more Basque until later days where its nobles were allied to the Crown of Castile, finally under the Jiménez dynasty.  Munia was mother of Fruela's eventual successor, Alfonso. According to legend, she was also mother of Jimena, mother of the legendary hero of romance Bernardo del Carpio.

During his reign, the city of Oviedo was founded, on November 25, 761, when the Abbot Máximo and his uncle Fromestano erected a church in honour of Saint Vincent there. Under Fruela, good relations between the church and the king continued as in the reign of his father — Alfonso "the Catholic".

Fruela did not finish his reign happily. Having assassinated his brother Vimerano (this is the basis for his nickname), and with the nobles restless, he named as his successor Bermudo (not to be confused with Fruela's cousin Bermudo I), son of Vimerano. Unfortunately a plot was formed against him, which ended with Fruela's assassination in Cangas de Onís, his capital, and his cousin Aurelius being raised to the throne instead.

The bodies of Fruela and his wife Munia are interred in the cathedral of Oviedo.

References

Beni Alfons
720s births
Year of birth uncertain
768 deaths
8th-century Asturian monarchs